Redhorn Lake is located in Glacier National Park, in the U. S. state of Montana. Redhorn Lake is in the Livingston Range.

See also
List of lakes in Glacier County, Montana

References

Lakes of Glacier National Park (U.S.)
Lakes of Glacier County, Montana
Livingston Range